Amy Hathaway (born 1974) is an American former actress.  She first came to prominence as a teenaged actor, playing the role of Shelby Haskell in seasons two and three of My Two Dads (1989–90). She had major co-starring roles in the TV movie Last Exit to Earth (1996) and the feature film Joyride (1997). Her last television role was in a 2009 episode of The Closer, and her last film was a lead role in Gemini Rising (2013).

Career

1980s to 1990s
Hathaway made her debut in film in the year 1988, in the television film Mutts. In 1989, she acted in the film Kinjite: Forbidden Subjects which starred Charles Bronson. Her role was Rita Crowe which was the daughter of Bronson's character, LAPD Vice Squad detective Lt. Crowe.

From 1987 to 1990, Hathaway played the part of Shelby Haskell in the  sitcom series My Two Dads, as the best friend of lead character Nicole (Staci Keanan). in 1991, she appeared in the episode "Frank and Denise" of the series The Wonder Years, playing the episode's title character of Denise "The Grease" Lavelle, opposite Noah Blake as Frank "The Stank" Stanavukovic.

In 1996, Hathaway co-starred as Kali in the Katt Shea directed sci-fi TV movie Last Exit to Earth. In 1997, she played the part of Tanya in Joyride. Her character, which was described as a ravishing young hussy, was the daughter of a slimey man played by Adam West who uses her to entrap men.

One of Hathaway’s last feature film roles for the 1990s was in the Bryan Cranston directed Last Chance which was released in 1999.

2000s
Hathaway co-starred in the film Smiling Fish and Goat on Fire, released in 2000. It was a film about two brothers, with Hathaway playing the troubled Allison, girlfriend of Chris (played by her soon-to-be husband, Derick Martini). She played the part of Lynn in Sven Pape's comedy L.A. Twister that was released in 2004.

In 2009, she appeared as Lauren in the episode "Walking Back the Cat" of the series The Closer. In 2013, she co-starred in the sci-fi thriller Gemini Rising which starred Lance Henriksen.

Other work
Hathaway is currently a board adviser and stock holder in iDream Media Inc.

Personal life
Hathaway was married to Derick Martini from 2001 to 2003. Between 2002 and 2004, she attended the Santa Monica College and then, studied at the University of California and earned a degree in biological sciences. She is the great-granddaughter of a survivor of the Titanic sinking.

Hathaway married Naveen Jeereddi, with whom she went to school in the fourth grade at Chandler School. In 2008, they reconnected on Facebook and from there dated and married in 2010. They reside in Los Angeles with their four children.

She is an honorary member of "The New Hollywood" Women's Goal Group Inc., which was founded by actress Brianna Brown.

Filmography

References

External links 
 
 

American film actresses
Living people
1974 births
Place of birth missing (living people)
American television actresses
20th-century American actresses
21st-century American actresses
University of California alumni